The Theft of the Mona Lisa is a 1931 German drama film directed by Géza von Bolváry and starring Trude von Molo, Willi Forst, and Gustaf Gründgens. It is based on a true story. It was shot at the Tempelhof Studios in Berlin. The film's sets were designed by the art directors Andrej Andrejew and Robert A. Dietrich.

Plot 
In 1911, Vincenzo Peruggia is a poverty-stricken Italian glazier who falls in love with Mathilde, a French hotel maid. Struck by the girl's resemblance to Leonardo da Vinci's Mona Lisa, Vicenzo steals the painting from the Louvre in hopes of impressing her. When she proves to be fickle, the crestfallen hero confesses and is arrested. Unwilling to admit that he had been led astray by a woman, Vicenzo claims that he stole the painting in order to restore it to his native Italy and is hailed as a national hero.

Cast

See also
 The Mona Lisa Has Been Stolen (1966)

References

Bibliography 
 
 Klaus, Ulrich J. Deutsche Tonfilme: Jahrgang 1931. Klaus-Archiv, 2006.

External links 

 Der Raub der Mona Lisa Full movie at the Deutsche Filmothek

1931 films
Films of the Weimar Republic
1931 drama films
German black-and-white films
Films directed by Géza von Bolváry
German heist films
Films set in 1911
Films set in Paris
German drama films
Films scored by Robert Stolz
Mona Lisa
1930s German films
Films shot at Tempelhof Studios